The San Felipe incident was the first naval battle fought between Mexican and rebel forces during the Texas Revolution. On September 1, 1835, the American owned merchant ships San Felipe and Laura were crewed by Texans when they encountered the Mexican Navy warship Correo de Mejico and captured her after a bloody exchange of cannon fire. The battle occurred off the coast of Texas near Brazoria and is remembered for having involved Stephen F. Austin who was on board the San Felipe.

See also
Naval Battle of Campeche

References

Naval battles involving Texas
Mexican Texas
Naval battles involving Mexico
History of Texas
Maritime incidents in September 1835
1835 in Texas
September 1835 events